Farqua is a genus of spiders in the family Oonopidae. It was first described in 2001 by Saaristo. , it contains only one species, Farqua quadrimaculata, from the Farquhar Group islands of the Seychelles.

References

Oonopidae
Monotypic Araneomorphae genera
Spiders of Africa